5 jaar later (Dutch for 5 years later) is a Dutch television show presented by Beau van Erven Dorens (previously by Jeroen Pauw). In each episode a well-known Dutch person's life is discussed based on an interview that was recorded five years earlier and kept in a vault for years.

In 2017, NPO decided to no longer broadcast the show and the show then moved to the RTL 4 channel owned by RTL Nederland. Beau van Erven Dorens also took over as presenter of the show. Jeroen Pauw himself was the first guest on the show after Beau van Erven Dorens took over as presenter. Pauw's interview was conducted by Daphne Bunskoek fifteen years earlier.

Pauw won both a TV-beeld award as well as the Sonja Barend Award for the show. The show is also Pauw's idea and owned by Pauw's company TVBV.

Seasons

Season 1 

 Jan Marijnissen
 Katja Schuurman
 Frits Barend
 Reinout Oerlemans
 Frits Wester
 Bridget Maasland
 Mart Smeets
 Family of Theo van Gogh

Season 2 

 Jack Spijkerman
 Maurice de Hond
 Beau van Erven Dorens
 Paul de Leeuw
 Femke Halsema
 Joop van den Ende

Season 3 

 Gerd Leers
 Bernard Welten
 Ayaan Hirsi Ali
 Joost Eerdmans
 Hilbrand Nawijn
 Claudia de Breij

Season 4 

 Alexander Pechtold
 Chantal Janzen
 Henk Kamp
 Filemon Wesselink
 Sophie Hilbrand
 Jort Kelder
 Lange Frans

Season 5 

 Matthijs van Nieuwkerk
 Bram Moszkowicz
 Freek de Jonge
 Jörgen Raymann
 Ronald Plasterk
 Hero Brinkman

Season 6 

 Youp van 't Hek
 Jan Jaap van der Wal
 Fleur Agema
 Marco Borsato
 Thomas Dekker
 Peter Paul de Vries, Jeroen Smit and Willem Middelkoop

Season 7 

 Wilfred Genee
 Jolande Sap
 Ahmed Marcouch
 Wesley Sneijder
 Frans Bauer

Season 8 

 Gordon Heuckeroth
 Emile Roemer
 Jan Smit
 Adriaan van Dis
 Bert Koenders
 Sven Kramer

Season 9 

 Antoine Bodar
 Johan Derksen
 Jeroen van Koningsbrugge
 Heleen van Royen
 Diederik Samsom
 Ireen Wüst

Season 10 

 Jeroen Pauw
 Bram Moszkowicz
 Sacha de Boer
 Linda de Mol
 Jesse Klaver
 Susan Smit
 Epke Zonderland
 Hugo Borst
 Halina Reijn

References

External links 
 

2008 Dutch television series debuts
2000s Dutch television series
2010s Dutch television series
2020s Dutch television series
RTL 4 original programming
Dutch television shows
Dutch-language television shows
NPO 1 original programming